The Sound Dues (or Sound Tolls) were a toll on the use of the Øresund, or "Sound" strait separating the modern day borders of Denmark and Sweden. The tolls constituted up to two thirds of Denmark's state income in the 16th and 17th centuries. The dues were introduced by King Eric of Pomerania in 1429 and remained in effect until the Copenhagen Convention of 1857 (with the sole exception of Swedish ships between 1660 and 1712). Tolls in the Great Belt had been collected by the Danish Crown at least a century prior to the establishment of the dues by Eric of Pomerania.

History

All foreign ships passing through the strait, whether en route to or from Denmark or not, had to stop in Helsingør and pay a toll to the Danish Crown. If a ship refused to stop, cannons in both Helsingør and Helsingborg could open fire and sink it. In 1567, the toll was changed into a 1–2% tax on the cargo value, providing three times more revenue. To keep the captains from understating the value of the cargo on which the tax was computed, the right to purchase the cargo at the stated value was reserved.

In order to avoid ships simply taking a different route, tolls were also collected at the two other Danish straits, the Great Belt and the Little Belt; sometimes non-Danish vessels were forbidden to use any other waterways but the Øresund, and transgressing vessels were confiscated or sunk.

The Sound Dues remained the most important source of income for the Danish Crown for several centuries, thus making Danish kings relatively independent of Denmark's Privy Council and aristocracy. However, the dues were an irritant to nations engaged in trade in the Baltic Sea, especially Sweden. Sweden had initially been exempted from the dues at the time of their introduction because it was then in the Kalmar Union along with Denmark. However, after the Kalmar War and the Treaty of Knäred in 1613 Denmark-Norway introduced dues on cargoes from Sweden's Baltic possessions and on non-Swedish ships carrying Swedish cargo. The friction over the Dues was an official casus belli (reason for war) of the Torstenson War in 1643.

In 1658, Denmark-Norway had to cede her provinces east of the sound (Scania, Halland, Blekinge, Bohuslän, and the island of Ven) to Sweden as a consequence of the Second Northern War. Thus, the toll could not be enforced as well as before but Denmark-Norway retained its established right of the dues. Swedish shipping became exempt from the Sound Dues by the terms of the Treaty of Copenhagen, signed on 27 May 1660. The exemption was withdrawn after Sweden's defeat in the Great Northern War and the Treaty of Frederiksborg of 1720, although the eastern shore of the Sound was now Swedish.

Copenhagen Convention

The Copenhagen Convention, which came into force on 14 March 1857, abolished the dues and all Danish straits were made international waterways free to all commercial shipping.

See also
 Skibsklarerergaarden

References

Literature 
 Degn, Ole. Tolden i Sundet: Toldopkrævning, politik og skibsfart i Øresund 1429-1857. København: Told- og Skattehistorisk Selskab, 2010. .

Degn, Ole (Editor). The Sound Toll at Elsinore: Politics, Shipping and the Collection of Duties 1429-1857. Copenhagen: Museum Tusculanum Press and The Danish Society for Customs and Tax History, 2017. .

Economic history of Denmark
Toll (fee)
1429 establishments in Europe
1420s establishments in Denmark
15th century in Skåne County
1857 disestablishments in Europe
Law of the sea
Øresund